Chocolate-coated (or chocolate-covered) peanuts are a popular bulk vending product. They consist of peanuts coated in a shell of chocolate. They have a reputation in many countries of being an item most familiar from the concession counter.

In some countries, they are sold under the brand Goobers, which is the earliest and one of the most popular brands of the product, made by Nestlé. They can be found at movie theaters and grocery stores around the world. Many other brands also exist.

Vegan chocolate-coated peanuts are made of sugar (non-refined), cocoa mass, cocoa butter, and vanillin.

A similar candy, also commonly sold at concession counters, is the chocolate-coated raisin.

History 
Goobers were introduced in the United States in 1925 by the Blumenthal Chocolate Company. Ward Foods acquired Blumenthal in 1969. Ward Foods was acquired by Chicago-based Terson Company in 1981.  Nestlé acquired the brand in January 9th of 1984 from Terson Company.

Etymology 
While the brand name "Goobers" is trademarked, "goober" itself is an American English word for peanut, probably derived from the Gullah word guber (meaning "peanut"), which is in turn derived from the KiKongo word n'guba.

See also
 List of peanut dishes

References

See also
 List of chocolate-covered foods
 

Chocolate-covered foods
Peanut dishes